Interstate 8 is the second EP by alternative rock band Modest Mouse, released on Up Records in 1996.  It contains the band's original demo,  Live in Sunburst Montana, which was recorded in Isaac Brock's garage in Issaquah, Washington. 
"Interstate 8," "Broke," "All Night Diner," and "Sleepwalking" were later included on the  Building Nothing Out of Something rarities compilation released in 2000.

The studio recordings of "Tundra/Desert", "Novocain Stain", and "Beach Side Property" are available on the band's debut album This Is a Long Drive for Someone with Nothing to Think About.

Rarity

Heavily sought-after by collectors, this album was reissued on Isaac Brock's Glacial Pace record label in early 2015 on both CD and vinyl.

Track listing
"Interstate 8" – 4:39
"All Night Diner" – 4:44
"Sleepwalking (Couples Only Dance Prom Night)" (melody from "Sleep Walk" by Santo and Johnny) – 3:23
"Tundra/Desert" – 5:24
"Edit the Sad Parts" – 9:33

"Live In Sunburst, Montana"
"Beach Side Property" – 6:08
"Buttons to Push the Buttons" – 2:25
"Novocain Stain" – 3:29
"Broke" – 2:56
"Whenever You Breathe Out, I Breathe In (Positive/Negative)" – 4:23
"Edit the Sad Parts" – 7:00

Tracks 6–11 are listed only as Live in Sunburst Montana, demos recorded in Isaac Brock's garage (in Washington). "Tundra/Desert" first appeared on This Is a Long Drive for Someone with Nothing to Think About, along with new versions of "Novocain Stain" and "Beach Side Property".

Personnel

 Isaac Brock – Guitar, Vocals
 Eric Judy – Bass
 Jeremiah Green – Drums

With:
 Nicole Johnson – Vocals on Track 1 & 3

References

Modest Mouse albums
1996 EPs